The 1973 NFL season was the 54th regular season of the National Football League. The season was highlighted by O. J. Simpson becoming the first player to rush for 2,000 yards in one season.

The season ended with Super Bowl VIII when the Miami Dolphins repeated as league champions by defeating the Minnesota Vikings  at Rice Stadium in Houston, Texas. The Pro Bowl took place on January 20, 1974, at Arrowhead Stadium in Kansas City, Missouri; the AFC beat the NFC

Draft
The 1973 NFL Draft was held from January 30 to 31, 1973 at New York City's Americana Hotel. With the first pick, the Houston Oilers selected defensive end John Matuszak from the University of Tampa.

Major rule changes

Jersey numbering system
The league's jersey numbering system is adopted (players who played in 1972 are grandfathered):
1–19: Quarterbacks and specialists
20–49: Running backs, fullbacks and defensive backs
50–59: Centers and linebackers
60–79: Defensive linemen, guards, and offensive tackles
80–89: Wide receivers and tight ends
Numbers 0, 00, and 90 to 99 are no longer allowed to be issued, even though these numbers were rarely issued anyway (two players wearing 00 at the time, Jim Otto and Ken Burrough, were grandfathered).

The system would later be modified throughout the years to increase the available numbers to different positions due to increasing team rosters and teams retiring numbers .

Other new rules
Defensive players cannot jump or stand on a teammate while trying to block a kick (leverage).
The clock is to start at the snap following all changes of possession. Previously, the clock started on a change of possession when the ball was spotted ready for play by the referee, except if the ball went out of bounds on the change of possession, there was an incomplete pass on fourth down, the change of possession occurred on the final play of the first or third quarter, or either team took a timeout immediately; in those cases, the clock started on the snap. 
If there is a foul by the offensive team, and it is followed by a change of possession, the period can be extended by one play by the other team.
If the receiving team commits a foul after the ball is kicked, possession will be presumed to have changed; the receiving team keeps the ball.

Division races
Starting in 1970, and until 2002, there were three divisions (Eastern, Central and Western) in each conference. The winners of each division, and a fourth “wild card” team based on the best non-division winner, qualified for the playoffs. The tiebreaker rules were changed to start with head-to-head competition, followed by division records, records against common opponents, and records in conference play.

National Football Conference

 For the last time until 1997, the last two unbeaten teams in the league met in Week 7, with the Vikings tipping the Rams 10–9.

American Football Conference

Final standings

Tiebreakers
N.Y. Jets finished ahead of Baltimore in the AFC East based on head-to-head sweep (2–0).
Cincinnati finished ahead of Pittsburgh in the AFC Central based on better conference record (8–3 to Steelers' 7–4).
Kansas City finished ahead of Denver in the AFC West based on better division record (4–2 to Broncos' 3–2–1).
Dallas finished ahead of Washington in the NFC East based on better point differential in head-to-head games (13 points).
San Francisco finished ahead of New Orleans in the NFC West based on better division record (2–4 to Saints' 1–5).

Playoffs

Awards

Coaching changes

Offseason
Baltimore Colts: Howard Schnellenberger was hired as head coach. Don McCafferty was fired after going 1-4 to start the 1972 season. John Sandusky replaced McCafferty, getting the Colts to finish 1972 with a 5–9 record.
Detroit Lions: Joe Schmidt resigned. Don McCafferty was named as Schmidt's replacement.
Los Angeles Rams: Tommy Prothro was fired and replaced by Chuck Knox.
New England Patriots: Chuck Fairbanks joined the team as both head coach and general manager. John Mazur resigned after going 2-7 to start the 1972 season, and Phil Bengtson then served as interim.
New Orleans Saints: J. D. Roberts was fired midway through the 1973 preseason. John North served as head coach for the rest of the preseason and the 1973 regular season onward.
Philadelphia Eagles: Ed Khayat was replaced by Mike McCormack.
St. Louis Cardinals: Bob Hollway was fired and replaced by Don Coryell.

In-season
Houston Oilers: Bill Peterson was fired after the Oilers lost their first five games. Sid Gillman finished out the rest of the season.
San Diego Chargers: Harland Svare left the team after going 1–6–1. Ron Waller served for the last six games.

Stadium changes
The Buffalo Bills moved from their original home at War Memorial Stadium and played their first season at Rich Stadium.

From October 7, the New York Giants moved from Yankee Stadium to the Yale Bowl in New Haven, Connecticut, where they would play the rest of 1973 and all of 1974. The Giants were forced out of Yankee Stadium after it closed to be renovated to a baseball-only venue. Also, a new Giants Stadium in East Rutherford, New Jersey was already under construction by 1973, but it would not open until 1976.

Uniform changes
 The Buffalo Bills added blue pants to be worn with their white jerseys. 
 The Chicago Bears changed their "C" helmet logo from white to orange with white trim
 The Los Angeles Rams introduced new uniforms, reverting their white-and-blue helmets back to the gold-and-blue helmets last used in 1963. The new design included gold pants, blue jerseys with white numbers and white jerseys with blue numbers. Both jerseys included curling rams horns on the sleeves: yellow horns on the blue jerseys and blue horns against yellow sleeves on the white jerseys.
 The Miami Dolphins added stripes to their aqua jerseys, while standardizing their white jerseys to include stripes. During their undefeated season, most Dolphins wore white jerseys with stripes, but some did not, including Bob Griese and Larry Csonka. Also, the Dolphins added orange-topped socks with aqua and white stripes. 
 The New England Patriots added blue outlines to the numbers of both their red and white jerseys. Stripes were also added to the sleeve ends: blue and white for the red jerseys, and blue and red for the white jerseys.

Television
This was the fourth and final year under the league's broadcast contracts with ABC, CBS, and NBC to televise Monday Night Football, the NFC package, and the AFC package, respectively. All three networks renewed their deals for another four years.

New television blackout rules

Through December , all NFL home games (including championship games and Super Bowls) were blacked-out on television in each team's respective city. The first exception was Super Bowl VII in Los Angeles in January 1973; the league changed their policy to black out home games only if tickets had not sold out. This expanded the league's television presence in teams' home cities on gameday.

The policy was put into effect when, in 1972, the Washington Redskins made the playoffs for only the second time in 27 seasons. Because all home games were blacked-out, politicians — including devout football fan President Richard Nixon — were not able to watch their home team win. NFL commissioner Pete Rozelle refused to lift the blackout, despite a plea from Attorney General Richard Kleindienst, who then suggested that the U.S. Congress re-evaluate the NFL's antitrust exemption. Rozelle agreed to lift the blackout for Super Bowl VII on an "experimental basis," but Congress intervened before the 1973 season anyway, passing Public Law 93-107; it eliminated the blackout of games in the home market so long as the game was sold out by 72 hours before kickoff.

With the new rule, the NFL recorded over one million no-shows by ticketholders to regular season games in 1973.

References

 NFL Record and Fact Book
 NFL History 1971–1980 (Last accessed December 4, 2005)
 Total Football: The Official Encyclopedia of the National Football League

1973
National Football League